Alexia Robinson is an American beauty pageant titleholder from St. Louis, Missouri that was crowned Miss United States 2019. She was one of six African-American beauty pageant competitors to win major titles in 2019, the others including Miss Universe, Miss America, Miss USA, Miss Earth USA and Miss Teen USA. Robinson is an advocate for domestic violence awareness. She has previously competed for Miss Missouri USA.

References

Year of birth missing (living people)
Living people
American beauty pageant winners